Events in the year 2012 in Namibia.

Incumbents 

 President: Hifikepunye Pohamba
 Prime Minister: Nahas Angula (until 4 December), Hage Geingob (from 4 December)
 Chief Justice of Namibia: Peter Shivute

Events 

 November 10 – 17 – The Namibian Tri-Nations tournament was held in the country.

Deaths

References 

 
2010s in Namibia
Years of the 21st century in Namibia
Namibia
Namibia